Fontel Mines (born February 26, 1985) is an American football coach and former tight end. He is currently the wide receivers coach and offensive recruiting coordinator for Virginia Tech. He previously was the tight end coach for the Old Dominion Monarchs. He played college football at Virginia for coach Al Groh from 2002 to 2006 and played in the National Football League (NFL) for 3 seasons from 2007 to 2009.

Early years
Mines attended Hermitage High School in Richmond, Virginia and was a student and a letterman in football and basketball. In football, as a senior, he was a first-team Group AAA All-state selection and made 37 receptions for 674 yards and ten touchdowns.

College career
Mines played collegiately at the University of Virginia.  He played in 42 games, starting 20.  He had 68 career receptions for 737 yards and 5 touchdowns.

Professional career

Chicago Bears
Mines was signed to the Chicago Bears practice squad on September 2, 2007. They signed him to the active roster on December 26, 2007.

After spending the 2008 season on the Bears' practice squad, Mines was re-signed to a future contract on December 29, 2008. He was waived/injured on August 25 and subsequently reverted to injured reserve.

Mines was waived by the Bears on March 1, 2010.

References

External links
JMU football bio
Chicago Bears bio

1985 births
Living people
Sportspeople from Richmond, Virginia
Players of American football from Richmond, Virginia
American football tight ends
Virginia Cavaliers football players
Chicago Bears players
Chowan Hawks football coaches
Richmond Spiders football coaches
Delaware Fightin' Blue Hens football coaches